The 1994 Virginia Slims of Los Angeles was a women's tennis tournament played on outdoor hard courts at the Manhattan Country Club in Manhattan Beach, California in the United States that was part of the Tier II category of the 1994 WTA Tour. It was the 21st edition of the tournament and was held from August 8 through August 14, 1994. Tenth-seeded Amy Frazier won the singles title and earned $80,000 first-prize money.

Finals

Singles

 Amy Frazier defeated  Ann Grossman 6–1, 6–3
 It was Frazier's 1st singles title of the year and the 4th of her career.

Doubles

 Julie Halard /  Nathalie Tauziat defeated  Jana Novotná /  Lisa Raymond 6–1, 0–6, 6–1

References

External links
 ITF tournament edition details
 Tournament draws

Virginia Slims of Los Angeles
LA Women's Tennis Championships
Sports competitions in Manhattan Beach, California
Virginia Slims of Los Angeles
Virginia Slims of Los Angeles
Virginia Slims of Los Angeles
Virginia Slims of Los Angeles